The Ural-4320 is a general purpose off-road 6×6 vehicle, produced at the Ural Automotive Plant in Miass, Russia for use in the Russian army. Introduced in 1976, it is still in production today.
The wheel arrangement for the Ural-4320 was designed for transporting cargo, people and trailers on all types of roads and terrain. It also serves as a launching platform for the BM-21 "Grad" rocket launcher.



Gallery

Specifications

Early versions of the Ural-4320 were fitted with the KamAZ-740 V8 diesel engine, ohv, displacement 10,857 cc (bore/stroke ratio ), compression ratio 16:1. Power  at 2,600 rpm. Torque  at 1,500 rpm.

Versions

 Ural-4320-**** - ** - chassis with the standard ("classic") metal cab and a carrying capacity of about 7.9 tons.
 Ural-4320-19 ** - ** - LONG CHASSIS, capacity about 12 tons.
 Ural-43203-**** - ** - chassis with reinforced front suspension.
 Ural-43204-**** - ** - reinforced truck chassis, increased payload.
 Ural-43206- 4×4 variant with a 180 hp YaMZ-236 diesel and a capacity of 4200 kg.
 Ural-43206-41" - with the 230 hp YaMZ-236NE2 turbodiesel.
 Ural-43206-0551" - 4×4 variant with a 4-door cab and carrying capacity 3600 kg.
 Ural-43202-**** - ** - truck tractor with semi-trailer for use on all types of roads.
 Ural-5557/55571- **** - ** - chassis for the installation of production equipment and special installations mass of ~ 12–14 m wide with low-profile tires with CTIS, which significantly increases the permeability of the vehicle.

Cab and tail options:

 Ural-4320/5557 - 40/41 - All-metal, three seat, two-door cab, just under the symbol produced machines with dual four-door cab;
 Ural-4320/5557 - 44 - All-metal, three seat, two-door cabin with a sleeping bed;
 Ural-4320/5557 - 48/58/59 - new version with a more comfortable cabin with large volume bonnet and sprung driver's seat;

All versions are equipped with IVECO cabs

Operational history

2022 Russian invasion of Ukraine
The vehicle was used during the 2022 Russian invasion of Ukraine. Oryxspioenkop analyzed photographic and video data and found Russia lost at least 478 Ural-4320s (329 destroyed, remainder damaged, abandoned and/or captured).

Users 

 
  
 
Bulgaria
  
  — 80 vehicles.
  - Several hundred vehicles many need new parts in order to function.
 
 
 
 
  — In service as of January 2019.
  — ~100
  - 183 acquired in 2015
  — 20 donated in 2017.
  - 8,000+
  - ~900
  - 50+ Captured in 2022.
  — 36 trucks.
  — 320 trucks in the Army and the Marine Corps, it will soon be the standard model.

Variants

Military
Standard cargo/troop transport equipped with a cargo bed. It can be used to transport troops, weapons and other supplies. It has two collapsible benches and a canvas top to provide protection from the elements.

 Fully armored Ural-4320VV originally built for the Internal Troops

Civil

See also
Ural-5323
Family of Medium Tactical Vehicles
Medium Tactical Vehicle Replacement
M809 series trucks
M54
KrAZ-255

References

External links
 Official website of the Ural Automotive Plant for the Ural-4320

Ural Automotive Plant trucks
Military trucks of the Soviet Union
Military vehicles introduced in the 1970s